Richard Hart Davis (8 June 1766 - 21 February 1842) was a British merchant and Tory politician who served as Member of Parliament for both Colchester and Bristol.

Merchant career 
Davis was a successful merchant in Bristol trading with the West Indies. In 1810, he was said to have made £200,000 by "getting possession of all the Spanish wool in the kingdom". In 1803, he joined the Society of Merchant Venturers in Bristol.

Parliamentary career 
Davis was elected to Parliament in the 1807 general election as the MP for Colchester taking the seat from Whig MP William Tufnell. He didn't speak during this period until he stepped down from his seat allowing his son, Hart Davis, to take the seat. He was elected as MP for Bristol for 15 days before Parliament was dissolved for the 1812 general election where he received a personal letter from then Prime Minister Lord Liverpool who wished him luck in his election against the Radicals.

Political positions 
Davis opposed Catholic relief.

Personal life 
Davis' son, Hart Davis, was also a Tory MP.

References 

1766 births
1842 deaths
English merchants
Tory MPs (pre-1834)
Members of the Society of Merchant Venturers
UK MPs 1807–1812
UK MPs 1812–1818
UK MPs 1818–1820
UK MPs 1820–1826
UK MPs 1826–1830
UK MPs 1830–1831